R.O.D the TV is a 26-episode anime television series, animated by J.C.Staff and Studio Deen and produced by Aniplex, directed by Koji Masunari and scripted by  Hideyuki Kurata, about the adventures of three paper-manipulating sisters, Michelle, Maggie and Anita, who become the bodyguards of Nenene Sumiregawa, a famous Japanese writer. Featuring music by Taku Iwasaki, the series is a sequel to the Read or Die OVA. Its official title of R.O.D the TV is a catch-all acronym referring to the inclusion of characters from both Read or Die (the light novels, manga and OVA) and the Read or Dream manga, the latter of which revolves solely around the Paper Sisters. Promotional material for R.O.D the TV implies that the show revolves around the three sisters of Read or Dream; however, Nenene Sumiregawa of Read or Die is also considered a protagonist.

R.O.D the TV first premiered across Japan from October 1, 2003 through March 16, 2004 on pay-per-view satellite television platform SKY PerfecTV!. It was later aired across the terrestrial Fuji Television station from October 15, 2003 through March 18, 2004. The series spanned a total of 26 episodes, and was broadcast worldwide by the anime satellite television network, Animax.

The series was first distributed on DVD in North America by Geneon, in seven discs; the company finished releasing the series in summer 2005. Aniplex of America re-released the original Read or Die episodes and the TV series on Blu-ray in Winter 2010/2011.

Plot

The series begins in 2006, five years after the "I-Jin" incident detailed in the Read or Die OVA. Yomiko Readman (a.k.a. "The Paper", agent of British Library Task Force) has supposedly gone missing, and Nenene Sumiregawa, her former student and best friend, is still in Tokyo after her parents moved to the United States. Nenene has not written a book since Yomiko disappeared, as she has become lonely and frustrated that her sensei has never read her last book, and she feels she can't write again until she hears Yomiko's reaction to the book, so Nenene often disappears for long periods of time searching for Yomiko, and has been periodically doing so ever since her "disappearance".

During a trip to Hong Kong, Nenene meets the three sisters, Michelle, Maggie and Anita (from the Read or Dream manga), who are supposed to take care of her during her visit. However, the hotel at which Nenene is supposed to stay at is bombed, and at a press conference Nenene is briefly held hostage by a jealous rival in her industry. The three sisters end up becoming her bodyguards and join her back to Tokyo.

Each sister has paper manipulation skills similar to Yomiko, although less powerful and more focused in scope. After the initial action-filled adventure, the first several episodes take on the feel of an odd-couple comedy which focuses on tension between Nenene and the sisters, who move into her apartment and mooch off her, all while dealing with various crazies and psychos in their everyday lives. The sisters also perform odd jobs as agents of the Dokusensha (ostensibly a Chinese publishing company, but more like an Illuminati-type organization focusing on the collection of rare and powerful documents). This eventually puts them and Nenene in direct conflict with the British Library and the protagonists of Read or Die (Dokusensha is established as the British Library's rival in the Read or Die manga).

Events grow more serious as the series progresses as atrocities are committed by both sides, thrusting the main characters into the middle of a conflict between literary superpowers, the British Library and Dokusensha, who are both trying to collect ancient artifacts (books, of course) to control the entire world and even rewrite history. After a horrific collision between the two superpowers, Nenene and the Paper Sisters set out to find the missing Yomiko to learn the truth about the conflict and save the world from literary terrorism.

Characters

Main characters
The Paper Sisters' names seem to be derived from those of three real Hong Kong action stars: Maggie Cheung, Anita Mui, and Michelle Yeoh (who has also been credited as "Michelle Khan"). These three actresses starred together in the 1993 movie The Heroic Trio as the titular super-powered heroines. Alternatively, a possible reference is Hong Kong actress Michelle Reis, whose surname means "king" in Portuguese (her father being Portuguese).

 
 The youngest sister is a spitfire who specializes in using her paper offensively (by using paper "blades" and throwing index cards like shuriken), but she also relies upon her impressive physical martial arts skills in combat. Unlike all other known Paper Masters, she dislikes books (but is obsessed with collecting frogs and drinking milk). Although Anita sometimes acts bratty and self-important, she deeply loves her sisters. She frequently fights with Nenene, who is equally outspoken, but beneath their squabbles, they demonstrate a strong bond through the series. She is well liked in her class and is especially admired by classmate named Hisami Hishiishi (whom Anita nicknames "Hisa"). Hisa compares the two to the main characters with an extremely close friendship in Anne of Green Gables. Like Maggie, she is also flat chested but unlike the latter; she mostly resembles an elementary school student-(especially in height).

 a.k.a. Ma-nee
 
 A tall, boyish, quiet wallflower with somewhat depressed looks, her power usually manifests as familiars – beings she controls made of paper; her sisters also rely on her for her strong defensive capabilities. She is known for being easily embarrassed and enjoying tight cosy spots to relax in (which is why she sleeps in the closet). Michelle says her favourite author is Ernest Hemingway, but Maggie quickly points out that she likes Nenene's works too. She strongly looks up to her older sister, Michelle, and compares herself negatively to her. She cares for her sisters and always tries to protect them at the expense of her own safety. Anita believes Maggie to be strongest Paper Sister in combat. Because of her masculine appearance; including her flat chest, she strongly resembles a teenage boy.

 a.k.a. Mi-nee (her surname is sometimes spelled "Chan," the transliteration of the kana spelling her name, but scenes in the series show her name romanized as "Cheung")
 
 The oldest sister, generally considered the leader and strategist of the three. She has a cheerful, apparently ditzy personality. Her favourite books are the Harry Potter series, and she has a soft spot for cute things and small children. She is almost supernaturally calm, and her enemies find it difficult to manipulate her emotions; their enemy Webber notes her emotional balance makes her resistant to his sonic tortures. Michelle manifests her paper powers primarily through ranged weapons, such as bows and arrows. Michelle's love of books almost matches that of Yomiko's; when she arrives in Japan, Michelle buys out so many book stores that people begin to speculate Yomiko has returned.

 a.k.a. 'Sensei,' Nene-nee-san
 
 A prodigy novelist in her high school years, usually referred to as sensei and originally featured in the Read or Die manga as a teenage friend of the older Yomiko. She is often frustrated with Yomiko's obsession with books – and later the Paper Sisters when they move into her home – and chides her for being absentminded, leaving post-its in her room. Since Yomiko's disappearance, she has become very self-sufficient but unfortunately wistful, cranky and bitter at times in her loneliness. She remained in Japan, despite her parents' move to the United States, in order to housekeep and tend to Yomiko's personal effects until her (presumed) return.

Characters from Read or Die

 
 The former "Agent Paper" of the British Library, and Nenene's close friend, does not appear until episode 15 of the series, with only the vague suggestion before she appears of something terrible happening to her around the same time the British Library was destroyed. Yomiko's abilities and power as a papermaster are far greater than those of the Paper Sisters, as she does not seem as limited to one form of use for her powers, whereas Anita, Maggie and Michelle all have one speciality.

 
 She is the second I-Jin clone of Mata Hari that Yomiko met in the R.O.D OVA. At the end of the original series, Nancy suffered extensive brain damage as a result of oxygen deprivation; the result was that her mental state was reduced to that of a child, with no memories of her earlier actions. Desperate to protect her, Yomiko took Nancy and ran off into hiding. When introduced in the TV series, Nancy's personality is that of a young girl, far from the femme fatale she was before she was injured.

 
 An American munitions expert, frequently hired by the British Library for mercenary work. Anderson has no superpowers, but is well trained and good with weapons. A weapon of sorts he wields is his knowledge of papermasters, being more knowledgeable than most when pitted against them. He is a sarcastic realist who tries to keep situations calm and professional, although sometimes he is overwhelmed by the eccentric, super-human people around him. He has a young daughter named Maggie, but with no relation to the aforementioned papermaster. Probably because of his daughter, he is less ruthless than a soldier like him would otherwise be (i.e., when he fights the three sisters he doesn't try to murder them, and he refuses to kill children, such as Anita).

Joseph Carpenter a.k.a. 
 
 The head of the British Library Special Operations Unit and Yomiko's former boss. He took control of the organization after the death of the Gentleman and is now often referred to as "Mr. Carpenter." Compared to his appearance in the OVA, his face seems a bit more lined from stress (and possibly age), and he now walks with the assistance of a cane. Initially, Joker appears as calm, reassuring, and easy-going as ever, but as the series progresses he gets more violent and high-strung, revealed to be an elitist who holds the same "human selection" principles as the I-Jin (the villains of the OVA). Disappointed by the decline of British global influence following the Gentleman's death, Joker implements a scheme to regain control of the world, no matter the human cost. At the end of the TV Series, he is seen recovering from a comatose state after being "force-fed" part of Mr. Gentleman's information during the execution of Operation Sleeping Books.

 
 Seen in the manga and OVA as Joker's office secretary and junior agent of British Library Special Operations, she now serves as his right hand henchwoman. Wendy's character has matured radically, from an enthusiastic, if clumsy, over-eager young assistant into a serious, ruthless agent willing to fulfil the British Library's plans by any means necessary. She is highly resentful of Yomiko (whereas she adored her in the OVA and manga), likely due to events laid out through the course of the TV series, and she is one of the few British Library personnel fully aware of Joker's plans.

 Seen in the OVA, now deceased. He was the head of the British Library and the true source of Britain's secret power over global affairs (i.e., it was because of Gentleman that Joker had the authority over the U.S. President in the OVA). In the TV series, the British Library made efforts to revive him with the purpose of reviving the British Empire. Operation Sleeping Books was launched as a last resort, where the British Library used the concept of "Skin Print" to record his human genome into paper and separated it into 7 books. Once an appropriate body/host was found, these books would have been transmitted to the host so that Gentleman may be reborn in a new body. The seven books are:
 The Book of Forlorn Blood
 The Book of Pulsing Flesh
 The Book of Powerful Arms
 The Book of Trotting Legs
 The Book of Rising Intellect
 The Book of Supporting Bones
 The Book of The All-Seeing Eye

New, Major & Minor Characters

 
 Joker's youngest henchman and extremely violent assassin, Junior is a mysterious, effeminate young boy about Anita King's own age who is a highly skilled master marksman and secret agent working confidentially under the British Library's Special Operations Division.  While on missions for Joker, he is referred to as Agent J and usually carries out dangerous and difficult missions using his physical intellect and martial arts, stealth, and his power of intangibility, which is later revealed to be a trait he inherited from his mother.

As an agent, Junior is highly adept at deceiving his enemies, comparable to Joker, Junior's enigmatic boss. While he is efficient as an agent, he somewhat lacks the ruthlessness of his legal caretakers, Joe Carpenter (Joker) and Wendy Earhart, or his father, Ikkyu Sojun. Extremely reserved and emotionally distant, he is easily drawn to those who show him kindness, which can explain his deep attraction towards the Paper Sisters whom he befriends later on.   Because he was raised by a Government agency, he is socially inept and his withdrawn demeanor and inexperience with friendship and love hints at a lonely upbringing.  After meeting Anita King in the Nishihama middle school, he becomes less aloof and he begins to develop a sense of individuality.

 Late in the series, Junior is revealed to be the child of two I-jin, Nancy Makuhari and the deceased Ikkyū Sōjun, and the tool in Joker's scheme. As the son of two great, though distinct beings, whose intellect and physiology is deemed as superior above all other humans, Joker considers him as "the perfect vessel"; hence Joker is keen to train him as an agent and later as a medium for resurrecting The Gentleman, an ancient man of power beyond knowledge. Because of the I-jin's sudden extinction, which took place five years earlier before the TV series and nine months prior to his birth, it could be said that Junior and his mother are the last of the I-jin.

 
 Nenene Sumiregawa's editor, who hired the Paper Sisters to guard her early on in the series. Usually very calm, despite apparently having recently given up smoking (evidenced by chewing a red pen, also a tool of his profession). Seemingly minor at first, he plays a bigger and darker role as the scope of Dokusensha's plans – for Nenene in particular – is revealed. Nenene gives him a Zippo lighter, which eventually returns to the giver along with important information.

 or 
 A carrier pigeon used by Mr. Kim to send messages and assignments to the Paper Sisters. The sisters name him after the famous Chinese film director, one of whose trademarks is the use of doves to highlight dramatic moments. The pigeon demands respect and pecks Maggie when she forgets to call him "-san" ("Mr."). It is unclear then, exactly how the pigeon communicates, as Mr. Lee tells him to "shut up" even though the bird did not vocalize anything. While originally serving Dokusensha, Mr. Woo remains a "friend" to the Three Sisters throughout the series.

 
 A Dokusensha operative who hands the sisters their mission briefings; Michelle refers to him as their "handler." He can usually be seen overseeing these missions from a safe distance away. Sonny Wong is often with him. During the "Twilight of the Papers," Mr. Kim disappears during the conflict in Dokusensha headquarters, only to turn up much later as a minor employee for the British Library.

 a.k.a. "The Recycler"
 
 A Paper Master employed by Dokusensha. He's mysterious, wearing sunglasses and a large coat that conceal most of his face, and he never speaks. He's incredibly physically strong as well and probably at least seven feet tall (given he is much taller than Maggie, who is six feet). He has no qualms about killing people to achieve his goals. He challenges the Paper Sisters during "Twilight of the Papers" episodes and proves stronger than all three combined, even capable of ripping Maggie's familiars apart with his hands, and he only meets his fate after Maggie successfully manages to fight him defensively until he is engulfed in a sea of ink released when a series of explosives in the building go off.

 
 An enthusiast and supporter of the British Empire. After the fire incident in the British library, he was entrusted by the British library to guard "The Book of Pulsating Flesh." He lives in a Romanian castle together with his faithful servant, Irving. The castle exterior and interior were specially design to detect disturbance from a certain distance and at the same time emit frequency on its own. As shown in TV series, he is an expert in sound and frequency where he uses a special pipe organ (also known as a frequency organ) to transmit various frequency to control mammals, manipulate people's emotions and create a semi-visible shield to protect himself. He holds a grudge against Yomiko Readman since she was responsible for the fire in the British Library. Though he proves to be a challenge to the Paper Sisters, he is defeated when the Paper Sisters create a paper "silencer" field which allows them to bypass his protection field.

Alice Alice Arquette a.k.a. "Triple A"
 
 Former archaeologist from British Museum and onsen freak. She was a British library agent whose mission was to retrieve the "Key" to activate the Sleeping Books, hidden in an ancient storeroom under a hot spring mountain built by her family. She was killed without mercy while surrendering by Sonny Wong, angering Drake, Nenene, and the Paper Sisters (despite the fact that Wong was technically there to help the Sisters), and Drake attempts to avenge her death.

 
 Another British Library agent believed to have gone rogue, who happened to meet Anita at her junior high school. He is hunted down by the British Library, who sent Junior to kill him and retrieve the book. He asks Anita to hide one of Mr Gentleman’s books when Junior shoots him. Before Anita and her sisters return to Hong Kong, she returns the book to Richard, who is recuperating in the hospital. After she leaves, however, Junior phases through a wall and takes the book, leaving Richard either unconscious or dead.

 
 A famous and an intelligent actor in theatrical circle, turned British Library agent. Dokusensha believes he sold the book entrusted to him by the British Library and used the money to build a town where the population were dedicated to his acting. Their efforts to divert the Paper Sisters from their mission to find the Sleeping Books are frighteningly effective. The town however is effectively wiped off the map afterwards by the Dokusensha. It is also important to note that the term "John Smith" means someone who remains nameless like Joe Bloggs or John Q. Public, this fact plays a vital role in uncovering who exactly he is in his episode.

 
 The President of the United States. Throughout the series he supports Joker's plans with the understanding that the United States would be the leading nation in the new world order Gentleman would bring about when resurrected. When he learns that it will be the United Kingdom, not the United States, to lead the new world order, he attempts to attack the UK only to have his forces destroyed. He is probably the same U.S. President shown in the Read or Die OVA, as he speaks with a Texan accent and when faced with adversity wets himself.

Other media
Dōjin game studio Easy Game Station created the side-scrolling video game ElePaper Action based on the series.
The Three Paper Sisters appeared in the cross-over game Battle Moon Wars as enemies, renamed as Anipon, Maggipon and Mipon.

References

External links
R.O.D -THE TV-  Official Japanese site
Geneon's official R.O.D. the TV website
Madman Entertainment's official R.O.D. the TV website
Aniplex USA's official Read or Die/ROD the TV website
 

R.O.D
2003 anime television series debuts
Action anime and manga
Aniplex
Fuji TV original programming
Geneon USA
J.C.Staff
Mystery anime and manga
Studio Deen